Matthias Augustinus Wilhelm Georg Opdenhövel (born 25 August 1970) is a German television presenter.

Biography 
Born in Detmold, Opdenhövel has worked as journalist and television presenter for German broadcasters ARD, Sat 1, Pro7, VIVA Germany, VOX and WDR. Together with Aleksandra Bechtel he presented Bitte lächeln between 1997 and 1998 on German broadcaster RTL 2. He also presented Frühstücksfernsehen Weck Up between 1998 and 2003 with Barbara Schöneberger on broadcaster Sat 1. 

Opdenhövel is married, has two sons and lives with his family in Cologne.

Television

Ongoing 
 since 2011: Sportschau, Das Erste
 since 2011: Sportschau live: Fußball, Das Erste
 since 2011: Sportschau live: Skispringen, Das Erste
 since 2013: Sportschau vor acht, Das Erste
 since 2018: Big Bounce – Die Trampolin Show, RTL
 since 2019: The Masked Singer, Pro7
 since 2019: Die Liveshow bei dir zuhause, Pro7 (with Steven Gätjen)

Formerly / specials 
 1997–1998: Bitte lächeln, Tele 5
 1999: Eins Live TV, WDR Fernsehen
 1999–2001: Hast du Töne?, VOX
 2003–2004: Die Quiz Show, Sat.1
 2005: TV total Bundestagswahl, Pro7
 2006: Das große Ochsenrennen, Pro7
 2006–2007: 1. Bundesliga, Arena
 2006–2011: Schlag den Raab, Pro7
 2006–2011: Die TV total Wok-WM, Pro7
 2006–2011: Das große TV total Turmspringen, Pro7
 2008: Die TV total Autoball Europameisterschaft 2008
 2009: Wipe out – Heul nicht, lauf!, Pro7
 2009: TV total Bundestagswahl, Pro7
 2009: Das große Kipp-Roll-Fall Spektakel, Pro7
 2009–2011: 1. Bundesliga, LIGA total!
 2010: Schlag den Star, Pro7
 2010: Die große TV total Stock Car Crash Challenge, Pro7
 2010: Die TV total Autoball Weltmeisterschaft 2010, Pro7
 2010: Unser Star für Oslo, Das Erste/Pro7
 2010: ECHO 2010, Das Erste
 2010–2011: Spieltaganalyse, Sport1
 2011: Unser Song für Deutschland, Das Erste/Pro7
 2011: Eurovision Total, Pro7
 2011: Die Show zum Tag des Glücks, Das Vierte
 2012: Brot und Spiele, Das Erste
 2012: Fußball-Europameisterschaft 2012 - Live-Moderator und Reporter im Quartier der deutschen Nationalmannschaft, Das Erste
 2012: Sportschau-Club, Das Erste
 2012: US Wahl 2012 – Die Wahlparty im Ersten, Das Erste
 2012–2013: Opdenhövels Countdown, Das Erste
 2013: Star-Biathlon, Das Erste
 2013: Nordische Skiweltmeisterschaft 2013 - Skispringen, Das Erste
 2013: Alles auf einen Deckel, WDR Fernsehen
 2013: Die Show der unglaublichen Helden, Das Erste
 2014: Star-Biathlon, Das Erste
 2014: Olympische Winterspiele 2014 – Skispringen und Interviews im Deutschen Haus, Das Erste
 2014: Fußball-Weltmeisterschaft 2014 – Live-Moderator mit Mehmet Scholl, Das Erste
 2014: 24 Stunden Quiz, WDR Fernsehen
 2015: U-21-Fußball-Europameisterschaft 2015, Das Erste
 2015: Gefällt mir! – Die total vernetzte Show, WDR
 2016: US-Wahl 2016 – Die Wahlnacht im Ersten, Das Erste
 2016–2017: Rate mal, wie alt ich bin, Das Erste
 2018: Fußball-Weltmeisterschaft 2018, Das Erste – Live moderator with Thomas Hitzlsperger, Stefan Kuntz and Hannes Wolf
 2019-2023: The Masked Singer, ProSieben

Awards 

 2007: Deutscher Fernsehpreis in category Best moderation entertainment for Schlag den Raab
 2008: Goldene Kamera in category Best entertainment for Schlag den Raab
 2010: Deutscher Fernsehpreis in category Best entertainment for Unser Star für Oslo
 2012: Deutscher Fernsehpreis in category Best sports broadcast for game analysis of UEFA Euro 2012 (together with Mehmet Scholl)
 2015: Deutscher Sportjournalistenpreis in category Best German sport moderator

Works 

 Die Schnellficker-Schuhe und andere Geschichten; Erlebnisse eines VIVA-Moderators. vgs-Verlag, 1998, .
 Steffi Hugendubel-Doll: Flipflops, iPod, Currywurst: Wer hat’s erfunden? cbj-Verlag, 2012, .

References

External links 

 
 Official website (in German)

German journalists
German television presenters
German sports journalists
German sports broadcasters
German male journalists
20th-century German journalists
21st-century German journalists
People from Detmold
1970 births
Living people
ARD (broadcaster) people
ProSieben people